White Plains Rural Cemetery is a historic cemetery located in the city of White Plains, Westchester County, New York. The cemetery was organized in 1854 and designed in 1855.  It contains miles of narrow, paved roads, none of which is in a straight line.  The roads create circular and lozenge-shaped areas for burials.  Also on the property is a former church, now cemetery office.  It was built in 1797, and is a -story, five-by-three-bay frame building with a high-pitched gable roof.  It was modified for office use in 1881.

The cemetery was added to the National Register of Historic Places in 2003.

Graves of Note
 Ralph Waite actor

See also 

 National Register of Historic Places listings in southern Westchester County, New York

References

Cemeteries on the National Register of Historic Places in New York (state)
Cemeteries in Westchester County, New York
1854 establishments in New York (state)
National Register of Historic Places in Westchester County, New York